A boomkicker  is a modern mechanical device on boats that pushes the boom up by one or more glassfiber rods. If the boom is sheeted in, the rods will bend and produce a force upwards. 

This provides several beneficial effects for the sailor. In light air, a boomkicker provides better sail shape by lifting the boom and opening the leech. No topping lift is required when using the boomkicker. As a consequence, reefing is safer and easier with better boom control, and when dropping the mainsail the boom will not hit the deck.

A boomkicker may be installed alongside a traditional block and tackle boom vang, and will work in close collaboration with it. It is not used with a hydraulic, or rigid vang, as that type of vang already performs the function of supporting the boom.

The boomkicker is, among others, widely used on the International Dragon Class.

References 

Sailing equipment